Steven Thomas (October 13, 1971 – found dead July 14, 2008) was an American entrepreneur who founded the computer security company Webroot Software.

Career 
In 1997, Thomas and business partner and girlfriend Kristen Talley founded Webroot, in Boulder, Colorado. The company offers computer security software and is best known for a software called Spy Sweeper, an antispyware product.

In 2005, Thomas and Talley sold most of their shares in the company to a group of California investors as part of a $108 million deal.

Death 
After being diagnosed with "possible" bipolar disorder, he went missing in June 2008. His body was found on July 14, 2008, at the bottom of Pali Lookout near Honolulu. An autopsy showed that his injuries appeared to be consistent with a fall several days earlier. The case is still open with the Honolulu Police and is deemed as an unattended death.

References

Accidental deaths in Hawaii
Accidental deaths from falls
1971 births
2008 deaths
American technology company founders
21st-century American businesspeople